Sebrus pseudosparsellus is a moth in the family Crambidae. It was described by Stanisław Błeszyński in 1961. It is found in the Democratic Republic of the Congo and Zimbabwe.

References

Crambinae
Moths described in 1961